Sansara pallidalae is a moth in the family Cossidae. It was described by George Hampson in 1892. It is found in Bhutan and Sikkim, India.

References

Zeuzerinae
Moths described in 1892